Jim Murphy (born ) is an American politician. He is a member of the Missouri House of Representatives from the 94th District, in Saint Louis County, serving since 2019. He is a member of the Republican party.

Electoral History

References

Living people
1950s births
Republican Party members of the Missouri House of Representatives
21st-century American politicians